Vivek Kumar Verma is an Indian politician and Member of the 18th Uttar Pradesh Assembly, representing Bisalpur as of March 2022. He is a member of BJP and won the election by a margin of over fifty thousand votes against INC, Samajwadi Party and AAP. He is the son of Agys Ramsaran Verma, who was the MLA for Bisalpur for four terms.

Election results 

source: Election Commission of India, Oneindia

References

Uttar Pradesh MLAs 2022–2027
Living people
Bharatiya Janata Party politicians from Uttar Pradesh
People from Pilibhit district
Year of birth missing (living people)